Natalie Hunter (born 13 February 1967) is an Australian sprint canoeist who competed in the mid-1990s. She finished eighth in the K-4 500 m event at the 1996 Summer Olympics in Atlanta.

References
Sports-Reference.com profile

1967 births
Australian female canoeists
Canoeists at the 1996 Summer Olympics
Living people
Olympic canoeists of Australia
Place of birth missing (living people)